Joseph Clifford Caffie (February 14, 1931 – August 1, 2011), nicknamed "Rabbit", was an American professional baseball player whose 12-year career as an outfielder began in the Negro leagues in 1950, was highlighted by 44 games played as a member of the – Cleveland Indians of Major League Baseball (MLB),  and ended in the minor leagues in 1961. He was born in Ramer, Alabama, where he attended Montgomery County High School.

Caffie broke in with the Cleveland Buckeyes of the Negro American League, played one season, and then was signed by the Indians in 1951. He reached the major leagues in September 1956 in the midst of three stellar seasons with the Buffalo Bisons of the Triple-A International League, where he batted .311, .330 and .295 from 1956–1958; in the middle year, 1957, he was the International League's batting champion and was selected to its All-Star team.

In his 1956 stint with the Indians, Caffie appeared in a dozen games, starting ten as the Tribe's left fielder, and had 13 hits (all singles), in 38 at bats, with four bases on balls and one run batted in, batting .342. The following August, he was summoned from Buffalo in August for a more extended trial with the 1957 Indians. In 32 games, with 17 starts in the outfield, Caffie collected 24 hits, including two doubles, a triple and three home runs, and batted .270.  He was hitting as high as .328 after 67 at bats on September 15, but slumped thereafter, going two for his last 22. All told, Caffie batted .291 in the majors with 37 hits. He stole three bases and was caught stealing three times.

See also
 List of Negro league baseball players who played in Major League Baseball

References

External links

1931 births
2011 deaths
African-American baseball players
Baseball players from Alabama
Buffalo Bisons (minor league) players
Charlotte Hornets (baseball) players
Cleveland Buckeyes players
Cleveland Indians players
Duluth Dukes players
Harrisburg Senators players
Indianapolis Indians players
Major League Baseball outfielders
Miami Marlins (IL) players
Montreal Royals players
People from Montgomery County, Alabama
Reading Indians players
St. Paul Saints (AA) players
San Diego Padres (minor league) players
Syracuse Chiefs players
Wilson Tobs players
20th-century African-American sportspeople
21st-century African-American people